Almăj is a commune in Dolj County, Oltenia, Romania with a population of 2,211 people. It is composed of four villages: Almăj, Bogea, Moșneni, and Șitoaia. It also included Beharca and Coțofenii din Față villages until 2004, when they were split off to form Coțofenii din Față Commune.

The commune is located in the northern part of the county and belongs to the Craiova metropolitan area.

References

Communes in Dolj County
Localities in Oltenia